Hemasiri Sellapperuma, is a Sri Lankan screenplay writer, editor and filmmaker in Sri Lankan cinema. He is a prolific director who directed the second most number of films in Sri Lankan cinema with thirty-six films in various genres.

Personal life
He completed education from St. Anthony's College, Panadura. During school, he achieved a medal of Queen as a Scout. He is also the chairman of the Lions club in Egodawatta. In addition to that, he is also a Justice in Peace.

His cousin son Rajitha Hiran is also a renowned comedy artist.

Career
While in the school, he worked as an editor at the institute of Serendib. He first directed a short film Saara Poro Jelivet. After completing education, he joined with his mentor, Consistence Cooray. He is first person to produce films for children in Sri Lanka. Under Consistence, Sellapperuma worked as an assistant director for his films such as: Samaja Sevaya, Gami Kolla and Asaranaya.

Later he worked as an assistant editor in the film Punchi Baba saha Nari Latha directed by Tissa Liyanasooriya. Then he joined with K. A. W. Perera and worked as an assistant director in several films including: Bicycle Hora, Seeye Nottuwa, Kathuru Muwath, Aparadhaya Saha Daduwama and Lokuma Hinawa. Meanwhile, he passed the written examination to register as a director and editor in National Film Co-operation by directing the film Sara Polowa Jaya Bimai.

In 1981, he made his debut cinema direction with the black and white film Jeewanthi. After the success of the film, he made the second film Sathweni Davasa which became a blockbuster of that year. In 1982, at the Malaysian Film Festival, the film won the Golden award for the Best Commercial Film in the Asia. In 1989, he made the blockbuster film Nommara 17. The film broke several commercial records, where the film screened record 210 days at the 'National' cinema hall in Maharagama as well as screened in the opening cinemas for 200 days. However before the screening, the lead actor Vijaya Kumaranatunga was assassinted. There was a big uproar in the cinema halls during the screening of the film. People were at queue at cinema halls from 8 am to witness Vijaya's last film. There have even been stabbing incidents recorded in 'Gemunu' and 'Manel' cinema theaters as well. In 18th Sarasaviya Awards in 1990, Nommara 17 won the award for the Most Famous Film with 40,535 votes.

He was honored with the 'Kala Jothi' Award as well. In 2015, he directed his last film Sanjaana.

Filmography

References

External links
 

Sri Lankan film directors
Living people
Sri Lankan film editors
Sri Lankan film producers
Year of birth missing (living people)